Soo-ah, also spelled Su-a, is a Korean feminine given name. Its meaning depends on the hanja used to write each syllable of the name. There are 67 hanja with the reading "soo" and 29 hanja with the reading "ah" on the South Korean government's official list of hanja which may be registered for use in given names. It was the eighth-most popular name for newborn girls in South Korea in the first nine months of 2017, with 1,416 out of 137,528 girls born during that period being given the name.

People with this name include:
Bae Suah (born 1965), South Korean writer
Su-a Lee (born 1970s), South Korean cellist
Hong Soo-ah (born 1986), South Korean actress
Park Soo-ah (born Park Soo-young, 1994), South Korean singer, former member of After School

Fictional characters with this name include:
Oh Soo-ah, in 2005 South Korean television series Green Rose 
Min Soo-ah, in 2011 South Korean film Blind
Im Soo-ah, in 2012 South Korean television series Shut Up Flower Boy Band
Hyun Soo-A, in 2018 South Korean television series Gangnam Beauty
Oh Soo-ah, in 2020 South Korean television series Itaewon Class
Choi Soo-ah, in 2020 South Korean television series True Beauty
Cha Soo-ah, in 2020 South Korean Netflix adaptation Sweet Home (TV series)

See also
List of Korean given names

References

Korean feminine given names